Marsel Ibragimov (born 4 August 1997) is a Russian professional ice hockey player who is currently playing for HC CSKA Moscow in the Kontinental Hockey League (KHL). He played major junior hockey in the Western Hockey League for the Victoria Royals and Edmonton Oil Kings.

References

External links

1997 births
Living people
HC CSKA Moscow players
Edmonton Oil Kings players
Victoria Royals players
Sportspeople from Novosibirsk